The Starhill, previously known as Starhill Gallery, is a luxury shopping mall located in the Bukit Bintang shopping district of Kuala Lumpur, Malaysia right opposite of Pavilion Kuala Lumpur. The mall reopened on 30 July 2005 and was previously known as Starhill Center.

In 1999, when business was in decline, it was acquired by YTL Corporation. YTL decided to do away with the anchor tenant-based business model and transform Starhill into a luxury brand retail centre. It underwent extensive renovation led by architect David Rockwell and reopened on 30 July 2005 as Starhill Gallery.

The mall is connected to the JW Marriott Kuala Lumpur by a tunnel. The link bridge also connects to the Ritz-Carlton Kuala Lumpur.

In 2020, Starhill Gallery was renamed once again as The Starhill. Under renovation since October 2019, the mall was reopened in phases from the second quarter of 2020 and will officially be re-launched in 2021. The top levels of the mall will be replaced with additional 162 rooms for JW Marriott.

Gallery

See also
Shopping in Kuala Lumpur
List of shopping malls in Malaysia

References

Shopping malls in Kuala Lumpur
Shopping malls established in 2005
2005 establishments in Malaysia
Postmodern architecture in Malaysia